The 1967 Utah Redskins football team was an American football team that represented the University of Utah as a member of the Western Athletic Conference (WAC) during the 1967 NCAA University Division football season. In their second and final season under head coach Mike Giddings, the Redskins compiled an overall record of 4–7 with a mark of 2–3 against conference opponents, placing fourth in the WAC. Home games were played on campus at Ute Stadium in Salt Lake City.

Schedule

After the season

NFL Draft
Three Utah players were selected in the 1968 NFL Draft.

References

Utah
Utah Utes football seasons
Utah Redskins football